Deguelia utilis, syn. Lonchocarpus utilis (cubé, (common) lancepod or barbasco) is a species of shrub in the family Fabaceae.

Cubé resin, the root extract from cubé and from barbasco (Lonchocarpus urucu), is used as a commercial insecticide and piscicide (fish poison).  The major active ingredients are rotenone and deguelin.  Although "organic" (produced by nature) rotenone is no longer considered an environmentally safe chemical.

Miscellaneous
Cubé is toxic to insects, fish, and other pets. The primary threat to humans and other mammals comes from inhaling the powdered root or root extract.

See also
 Lonchocarpus

utilis
Flora of Brazil
Flora of Guyana
Flora of Peru